Thysanoplusia daubei is a moth of the family Noctuidae. It is found in North and East Africa, Southern Europe, Arabia, Turkey, Southern Iran to the Himalayas, India, Indochina, China, Japan and Taiwan.

The wingspan is about 30 mm.

The closest relatives of T.daubei are the afrotropical Thysanoplusia indicator (Walker, 1858) and the South-East Asiatic Thysanoplusia lectula that is larger in size.

Biology
The larvae feed on Sonchus, Chondrilla, Cichorium and Mentha species.

References

External links

Fauna Europaea
Lepiforum.de

Plusiinae
Moths of Europe
Moths of the Middle East
Taxa named by Jean Baptiste Boisduval